The Monterey Museum of Art (MMA) an art museum located in Monterey, California. It was founded in 1959 as a chapter of the American Federation of Arts. The Monterey Museum of Art collects, preserves, and interprets the art of California from the nineteenth century to the present day. Notable holdings celebrate the heritage of Northern and Central California, and especially for early California images from the Carmel Art Colony.

The museum operates two facilities, one at 559 Pacific Street and the other at 720 Via Mirada (La Mirada). The Pacific Street location has eight galleries and houses the administrative and curatorial offices, and the Buck Education Center consisting of classrooms, a library and the Youth Gallery. In 1983, the Monterey Museum of Art acquired the historic estate of La Mirada, whose history reflects the heritage of the Monterey area. La Mirada was expanded with modern galleries and is used to present traveling exhibitions from other institutions, highlights of the museum's permanent collection that include masters of the nineteenth and twentieth centuries, and significant emerging artists of today such as Ingrid Calame.

Exhibitions
MMA presents approximately twenty exhibitions annually. These include thematic exhibitions selected from the permanent collection, presentations of local artists and major traveling exhibitions from other institutions. In addition to the museum's exhibitions, it presents educational programs that reach thousands of area youth annually, docent programs, classes, lectures and workshops, curatorial tours and public events such as a free Community Day organized for families. Other local institutions, including Monterey Peninsula College, Monterey Institute of International Studies, the Defense Language Institute and California State University Monterey Bay frequently use the museum as a resource for classes.

Permanent collections 
The museum's permanent collection consists of more than 14,000 objects in the following areas: early California painting (1875–1945), photography, contemporary art (1945–present), Asian art and American art (1875–1945). Highlights of the museum's collection include works by Armin Hansen, William Ritschel, Joan Miró, Henri Matisse and Pablo Picasso, as well as that of world-renowned photographers Edward Weston and Ansel Adams.

Early California painting 
Notable artists, represented in the museum, who worked in California in the late 19th and early 20th centuries:
Jules Tavernier
E. Charlton Fortune

Evelyn McCormick
Gottardo Piazzoni
Francis McComas
William Ritschel

Armin Hansen

Photography 
Photographers represented in the permanent collection:
Carleton Watkins
William Henry Jackson
Anne Brigman
Johan Hagemeyer
Edward Weston
Brett Weston
Ansel Adams
Imogen Cunningham
Wynn Bullock
Charles Sheeler
Aaron Siskind
Irving Penn
Sally Mann
Garry Winogrand

Contemporary art 
Contemporary art holdings:
Nathan Oliveira
David Park
Roland Petersen
Henri Matisse
Pablo Picasso
Salvador Dalí
Alexander Calder
Ilya Bolotowsky
Larry Rivers
James Rosenquist
Wayne Thiebaud

Asian art 
Asian art collection including textiles, woodblock prints, jade and lacquer objects, and ceramics from Japan, China and Korea.
Andō Hiroshige
Utagawa Kunisada
Katsushika Hokusai

American art 
American Art holdings from the 19th century to 1945.
Thomas Eakins
John Sloane
Childe Hassam
Oscar Bluemner
Stanton Macdonald-Wright
Rockwell Kent
Grant Wood
David Alfaro Siqueiros
Rufino Tamayo

Selected collection highlights

References 

 Ryce, Walter. "50 Fifty Grand". Monterey County Weekly, 09 Apr. 2009
 Baker, Kenneth. "Painter's solo show traces in steps of LeWitt". San Francisco Chronicle, 6 January 2011, Ovation, sec. F
 The Story of La Mirada. Edited by Gail L. Gonzales. Monterey, CA: Monterey Museum of Art, 1998

External links 

Art museums and galleries in California
Buildings and structures in Monterey, California
Museums in Monterey County, California
Tourist attractions in Monterey, California
Art museums established in 1959
1959 establishments in California